Neon Maniacs is a 1986 horror film. The film was also released under the title Evil Dead Warriors.

Plot
In the heart of San Francisco, the legions of the damned lay waiting beneath the Golden Gate Bridge. As night falls, they are unleashed upon the city to carve terror into the souls of the innocent. But when one young woman named Natalie (Leilani Sarelle) escapes a bloody teen slaughter, she cannot convince anyone that a rampaging army of psychotic monsters has mutilated her friends. Now haunted, hunted and having a hard time in high school, Natalie must arm herself and her classmates for one final bizarre battle against the horror of the "neon maniacs." Some of the scenes were filmed at Hollywood High School.

Cast

References

External links

1986 horror films
1986 films
Films set in San Francisco
1980s monster movies
American slasher films
American monster movies
1980s teen horror films
American teen horror films
1980s English-language films
1980s American films